The North Province (French province Nord) is one of three administrative subdivisions in New Caledonia. It corresponds to the northern and northeastern portion of the New Caledonian mainland.

The provincial government seat is at Koné.

Provincial Congress
Of the 22 seats in the provincial congress, the Kanak and Socialist National Liberation Front holds 11, the Caledonian Union has 7, the Rally for Caledonia in the Republic has 3, and Future Together has 1.

See also
 Politics of New Caledonia

References

Provinces of New Caledonia
Geography of New Caledonia